UFC Fight Night: Shogun vs. Smith (also known as UFC Fight Night 134) was a mixed martial arts event produced by the Ultimate Fighting Championship held on July 22, 2018, at Barclaycard Arena in Hamburg, Germany.

Background
The event was the second that the promotion has held in Hamburg, following UFC Fight Night 93 in September of 2016.

A light heavyweight bout between former title challenger Volkan Oezdemir and former UFC Light Heavyweight Champion Maurício Rua was expected to headline the event. The pairing was previously scheduled in the co-headliner slot at UFC Fight Night: Maia vs. Usman, but was delayed after Oezdemir was pulled from that event due to alleged visa issues stemming from a previous legal transgression, restricting his travel to Chile. The bout was again cancelled when Oezdemir was removed in favor of a bout against fellow former title challenger Alexander Gustafsson at UFC 227. He was replaced by Anthony Smith.

A bantamweight bout between Davey Grant and Manny Bermudez, was previously scheduled for UFC Fight Night: Thompson vs. Till. However, Grant pulled out of the fight after being diagnosed with a staph infection, and the bout was scrapped. The pairing was left intact and rescheduled for this event.

Ilir Latifi was scheduled to face former light heavyweight title challenger Glover Teixeira at the event. However on July 5, it was announced that Latifi suffered an injury and was pulled from the fight. He was replaced by The Ultimate Fighter: Team Edgar vs. Team Penn light heavyweight winner Corey Anderson.

Alan Jouban was expected to face Danny Roberts at the event, but pulled out on July 12 due to a neck injury. He was replaced by promotional newcomer David Zawada.

Results

Bonus awards
The following fighters earned $50,000 bonuses:
Fight of the Night: Danny Roberts vs. David Zawada
Performance of the Night: Anthony Smith and Manny Bermudez

See also
List of UFC events
2018 in UFC
List of current UFC fighters

References

UFC Fight Night
July 2018 sports events in Germany
Mixed martial arts in Germany
2018 in mixed martial arts
2018 in German sport
Sports competitions in Hamburg
Events in Hamburg